Edward Hoare may refer to:

 Edward Hoare (politician) (died 1765), Member of the Irish Parliament for Cork City, 1710–1713
 Sir Edward Hoare, 2nd Baronet (1745–1814), of the Hoare Baronets
 Edward Hoare (priest) (1802–1877), Irish Anglican priest
 Edward Hoare (cricketer) (1812–1894), English cricketer
 Edward Brodie Hoare (1841–1911), British Member of Parliament for Hampstead, 1888–1902
 Edward A. Hoare, chief engineer for the 1919 Quebec Bridge, the longest cantilever bridge span in the world
 Edward Hoare (RAF airman) (1890–1973), World War I flying ace